is a passenger railway station located in the city of Iyo, Ehime Prefecture, Japan. It is operated by the private transportation company Iyotetsu. The station is close to Iyoshi Station, located on the Yosan Line operated by JR Shikoku.

Lines

Layout
The station consists of a single dead-headed side platform serving one bi-directional track. The station is unattended.  During most of the day, trains arrive every fifteen minutes.

History
The station was opened on May 10, 1939.

Surrounding area
 Japan National Route 378

See also
 List of railway stations in Japan

References

External links

Iyotetsu Gunchū Line
Railway stations in Ehime Prefecture
Railway stations in Japan opened in 1939
Iyo, Ehime